The 2011 Rugby Borough Council election the Rugby Borough Council took place on Thursday 5 May 2011.

There were 16 seats up for election, one third of the council. The election produced a majority for the Conservative Party.

Election result

Ward results

2011 English local elections
2011
2010s in Warwickshire